The Roman Catholic Diocese of Saint-Jérôme is a Latin rite suffragan of the Archdiocese of Montréal.

Its cathedral episcopal see is Cathédrale Saint-Jérôme, dedicated to Saint Jerome (Hieronumus), in Saint-Jérôme, Quebec.

History 
It was erected on  23 June 1951 as Diocese of Saint-Jérôme / Sancti Hieronymi Terræbonæ (Latin), on territories split off from (its Metropolitan) the Archdiocese of Montréal, the Archdiocese of Ottawa and Diocese of Mont-Laurier.

Statistics 
As per 2014, it pastorally served 446,000 Catholics (97.2% of 459,000 total) on 2,116 km² in 35 parishes, 67 priests (52 diocesan, 15 religious), 18 deacons, 118 lay religious (21 brothers, 97 sisters), 3 seminarians.

Bishops

Episcopal Ordinaries
(Roman Rite)

Suffragan Bishops of Saint-Jérôme 
Émilien Frenette (1951.07.05 – death 1971.06.11), died 1983
Bernard Hubert (1971.06.25 – 1977.01.27), next Coadjutor Bishop of Saint-Jean-de-Québec (Canada) (1977.01.27 – 1978.05.03), succeeding as Bishop of Saint-Jean-de-Québec (1978.05.03 – 1982.02.27), Bishop of  Saint-Jean–Longueuil (Canada) (1982.02.27 – death 1996.02.02), also President of Canadian Conference of Catholic Bishops (1985 – 1987)
Charles-Omer Valois (1977.06.10 – retired 1997.01.22) 
Gilles Cazabon, Missionary Oblates of Mary Immaculate (O.M.I.) (1997.12.27 – retired 2008.07.03), previously Bishop of  Timmins (Canada) (1992.03.13 – 1997.12.27)
Pierre Morissette (2008.07.03 – 2019.05.21), also President of Canadian Conference of Catholic Bishops (2009.10.23 – 2011.10.18); previously Titular Bishop of Mesarfelta (1987.02.27 – 1990.03.17) as Auxiliary Bishop of Archdiocese of Montréal (Canada) (1987.02.27 – 1990.03.17), Bishop of Baie-Comeau (Canada) (1990.03.17 – 2008.07.03), Vice-President of Canadian Conference of Catholic Bishops (2007.10 – 2009.10.23).– incumbent Bishop Emeritus
Raymond Poisson (2019.05.21-Present), previously as Auxiliary Bishop of Diocese of Saint-Jerome and Titular Bishop of Gegi (2012.05.01-2015.09.08)  Bishop of Diocese of Joliette (2015.09.08-2018.05.18), Coadjutor Bishop of Saint-Jerome (2018.05.18-2019.05.21), Vice-President of Canadian Conference of Catholic Bishops (2019.09.28-), additionally appointed as Bishop of Diocese of Mont-Laurier (2020.06.01-).

Coadjutor 
Coadjutor  Bishop: Raymond Poisson (2018.05.18 - 2019.05.21)

Auxiliary 
BIOS TO ELABORATE & WORK-IN
Auxiliary Bishop: Raymond Saint-Gelais (1980.07.05 – 1988.02.19), appointed Coadjutor Bishop of Nicolet, Québec
Auxiliary Bishop: Gilles Lussier (1988.12.23 – 1991.09.07), appointed Bishop of Joliette, Québec
Auxiliary Bishop: Vital Massé (1993.10.20 – 2001.09.08), appointed Bishop of Mont-Laurier, Québec
Auxiliary Bishop: Donald Lapointe (2002.10.26 – 2011.07.30)
Auxiliary Bishop: Raymond Poisson (2012.05.01 - 2015.09.08), appointed Bishop of Joliette, Québec (later returned here as Coadjutor)

Other priests of this diocese who became bishops
Paul-Émile Charbonneau, appointed Auxiliary Bishop of Ottawa, Ontario in 1960
Luc Cyr, appointed Bishop of Valleyfield, Québec in 2001

See also 
list of Catholic dioceses in Canada

References

Sources and external links
Diocese of Saint-Jérôme site (in French)
GCatholic, with Google map - data for all sections
 Bibliography

Roman Catholic Ecclesiastical Province of Montreal
Christian organizations established in 1951
Roman Catholic dioceses and prelatures established in the 20th century
Organizations based in Quebec
Roman Catholic Diocese
1951 establishments in Quebec